National Mentoring Month is a campaign run throughout January by MENTOR and MENTOR Affiliates across the country. Launched in 2002, the campaign aims to unify and expand the mentoring movement, celebrate the power of relationships, and raise awareness around the importance of youth mentoring in the United States. 

Supporters and participants of National Mentoring Month include prominent nonprofit organizations, elected officials from the local, state, and federal level, and several U.S. Presidents and their administrations.  

There are a variety of ways for nonprofit organizations, corporations and businesses, elected officials, and individuals to get involved with National Mentoring Month and to drive positive change for young people.  

 Celebrate: Throughout January, there are several important dates to elevate and participate in. These include: 
 I Am A Mentor Day 
 International Mentoring Day 
 Dr. Milk Day of Service 
 Thank Your Mentor Day 
 Engage: There are many events, celebrations, and learning opportunities hosted throughout the month by local and national organizations. One of these is the National Mentoring Summit, an annual opportunity for the mentoring movement to come together, advance a collective mentoring agenda, strengthen programs and practices, and collaborate to support positive youth development through mentoring.
 Elevate: For action steps you can take to create mentoring opportunities in your community, at your workplace, and across the country, check out the National Mentoring Month toolkits. 
 Join the Movement: Visit the Mentoring Connector, a free, national database of mentoring programs and begin exploring local mentoring opportunities today!

See also
Youth mentoring
MENTOR
StudentMentor.org

References

External links
 Official National Mentoring Month web site
 National Mentoring Month page at MENTOR
 National Mentoring Month page at Corporation for National & Community Service Web site
 Who Mentored You? - National Mentoring Month page by the Harvard Mentoring Project
 America Mentors - free mentoring programs for first-generation, low-income college students

Alternative education
January observances
Health campaigns
Month-long observances